The 2014–15 Bayer 04 Leverkusen season is the 111th season in the club's football history.

Season review
In the 2013–14 season, Bayer Leverkusen finished in fourth place in the Bundesliga. A very tight finish for the UEFA Champions League qualifier spot with both Borussia Mönchengladbach and VfL Wolfsburg all capable of getting fourth place. In the end, Leverkusen came back from 1–0 down to win the final game 2–1. This was a must win game for them because Wolfsburg had won their game and were in the running to finish fourth ahead of Leverkusen.

The transfer window started very early for Bayer Leverkusen as they have announced a five-year deal for Swiss international striker Josip Drmić who was previously with 1. FC Nürnberg, who were relegated on the final matchday. The transfer was announced on 12 May 2014.

Players
As of 22 July 2014

(vice-captain)

(3rd captain)

Players out on loan

Transfers

In

Competitions

Bundesliga

League table

Results summary

Results by round

Matches

DFB-Pokal

UEFA Champions League

Play-off round

Group stage

Knockout phase

Round of 16

Statistics

Goalscorers
This includes all competitive matches.  The list is sorted by shirt number when total goals are equal.

Last updated on 5 October 2014

Assists 
This includes all competitive matches.  The list is sorted by shirt number when total assists are equal.

Last updated on 5 October 2014

Kits

References

Bayer 04 Leverkusen seasons
Bayer 04 Leverkusen
Bayer 04 Leverkusen